Devan Flanders (born 20 July 1999) is a New Zealand rugby union player who currently plays as a loose forward for the  in Super Rugby and  in New Zealand's domestic National Provincial Championship competition.

Early career

Devan Flanders attended Hastings Boys' High School, where he played First XV rugby alongside future  teammates Folau Fakatava, Lincoln McClutchie, Danny Toala and Kianu Kereru-Symes. He helped his team to two National Top 4 finals, narrowly losing the first against Mount Albert Grammar School (13 - 14) in 2016, but winning the second against Hamilton Boys' High School 25 to 17 after an undefeated season in 2017. Flanders was named man of the match following that victory.

In 2017, Flanders was named in the Hurricanes U18 team.

Senior career

On 7 August 2017, the Hawke's Bay Rugby Union announced that four players of that year's successful Hastings Boys' High School First XV side, including Devan Flanders, had signed with the union for 2018 and 2019.  Flanders made his Magpies debut on 19 August 2018 against Southland and earned his first start against Canterbury on 30 September 2018. He cemented himself as a regular starter for the Magpies in the following seasons. He has since re-signed with Hawke's Bay for 2020 and 2021.

On 26 June 2020, the Hurricanes announced that Flanders had re-signed with the franchise for the 2021 and 2022 seasons. Two years later, he-resigned for a further two seasons.

International career

After his last year at Hastings Boys' High School, Flanders was named in the New Zealand Secondary Schools team for a three-match international series in Australia.  He started in all three games, including a 34 - 11 victory over Australian Schools. For his outstanding performance during the series Flanders was rewarded with the Jerry Collins Memorial Bronze Boot.

Flanders was a member of the New Zealand Under-20 side that competed in the Oceania Rugby Under 20 Championship and the World Rugby Under 20 Championship in 2018 and 2019.

Reference list

External links
NZ Rugby History profile
itsrugby.co.uk profile

1999 births
Living people
People educated at Hastings Boys' High School
New Zealand rugby union players
Rugby union players from Hastings, New Zealand
Rugby union flankers
Rugby union number eights
Hurricanes (rugby union) players
Hawke's Bay rugby union players